The SS W. A. ​​Scholten was a passenger ship built for the Dutch shipping company Holland-America Line. Her launching took place on February 16, 1874, and the ship was handed over on April 11, 1874, which was used as an ocean liner on the North Atlantic and carried passengers, freight, and mail from Rotterdam to New York between 1874 and 1887. On November 19, 1887, the steamer sank after a ship collision in the English Channel, killing 132 people. The ship was named after Willem Albert Scholten, an industrialist from Groningen.

History
The ship was built at Robert Napier & Sons shipyard of Glasgow and was launched on February 16, 1874. She and her sister ship the P. Caland were handed over to Nederlandsch-Amerikaansche Stoomvaart Maatschappij, better known as Holland America Line. On May 16, 1874, departed on her Ten-day long maiden voyage from Rotterdam to the New York route. She would continued this service until she departed on what would be her last voyage. On 18 November 1887, when she was struck by another ship, the Rosa Mary. The Scholten suffered severe damage with a 2.43 meters (7.9 ft) wide hole in her port bow. As the water flooded the ship, the captain ordered everyone to abandon the ship. She was sank on 19 November 1887.

References

External links 

W.A. Scholten in list of shipwrecks off the coast of Dover on Internet Archive

Ships of the Holland America Line
Steamships
1874 ships